Auburn is a city in Bay County, Michigan, United States. The city's population was 2,087 at the 2010 Census. It is included in the Saginaw, Midland, and Bay City metropolitan area.

History
It was first settled in 1854. On February 26, 1869, the settlement was granted a post office with the name of Skinner. On November 19, 1877, the Skinner Post Office was renamed Auburn.
The default Zip Code of 48611 is shared by Williams Township, which encapsulates the town and covers much of 
southwestern Bay County.

Geography

Demographics

2010 census
As of the census of 2010, there were 2,087 people, 916 households, and 551 families living in the city. The racial makeup of the city was 97.5% White, 0.3% African American, 0.8% Native American, 0.5% Asian, 0.1% Pacific Islander, 0.3% from other races, and 0.5% from two or more races. Hispanic or Latino of any race were 2.0% of the population.

There were 916 households, of which 28.2% had children under the age of 18 living with them, 43.2% were married couples living together, 12.7% had a female householder with no husband present, 4.3% had a male householder with no wife present, and 39.8% were non-families. 34.5% of all households were made up of individuals, and 13.5% had someone living alone who was 65 years of age or older. The average household size was 2.24 and the average family size was 2.87.

The median age in the city was 40.9 years. 22% of residents were under the age of 18; 9.1% were between the ages of 18 and 24; 24.3% were from 25 to 44; 27.1% were from 45 to 64; and 17.6% were 65 years of age or older. The gender makeup of the city was 47.6% male and 52.4% female.

2000 census
As of the census of 2000, there were 2,011 people, 842 households, and 553 families living in the city. The racial makeup of the city was 97.51% White, 0.35% African American, 0.55% Native American, 0.30% Asian, 0.35% from other races, and 0.94% from two or more races. Hispanic or Latino of any race were 2.39% of the population.

There were 842 households, out of which 32.5% had children under the age of 18 living with them, 50.4% were married couples living together, 13.2% had a female householder with no husband present, and 34.3% were non-families. 29.1% of all households were made up of individuals, and 9.6% had someone living alone who was 65 years of age or older.  The average household size was 2.37 and the average family size was 2.97.

In the city, the population was spread out, with 25.6% under the age of 18, 8.4% from 18 to 24, 29.8% from 25 to 44, 22.6% from 45 to 64, and 13.6% who were 65 years of age or older.  The median age was 37 years. For every 100 females, there were 92.4 males.  For every 100 females age 18 and over, there were 86.1 males.

The median income for a household in the city was $42,014, and the median income for a family was $51,442. Males had a median income of $41,927 versus $25,720 for females. The per capita income for the city was $20,941.  About 5.1% of families and 6.4% of the population were below the poverty line, including 9.5% of those under age 18 and 11.6% of those age 65 or over.

Education
Auburn, within Bay City Public Schools, is home to Bay City Western High School and their principal Judy Cox, Western Middle School, and the Auburn Elementary School.

It is also home to Auburn Area Catholic School. The former Grace Lutheran school has closed and the students attend Lutheran schools outside the city.

Transportation

Highways
  courses west to Midland and east to Bay City. 

Special Note: The city's eastern overpass on US10 only exits from and to the east. The western overpass has exits to both east and west.

Public transit
 Bay Metro's Route 4 bus service stops in Auburn at the Auburn Square Shopping Plaza, 963 W Midland Rd.  Route 4 connects Auburn with Midland, Delta College, Saginaw Valley State University, and Bay City.

References

Notes

Sources

Cities in Bay County, Michigan
1854 establishments in Michigan
Populated places established in 1854